Skardu Fort or Kharpocho (Balti:) means The king of Forts is a fort in Skardu in the Gilgit-Baltistan region of Pakistan. Australian mountaineer and film maker Greg Child writes that the fort is "perched above the junction of the rivers" and overlooks the Rock of Skardu.

History 
The fort was built by king Ali Sher Khan Anchan at the end of the sixteenth century. The Dogra general Zorawar Singh, during his invasion of Baltistan in 1840, stormed it and razed it to the ground. Mughal emperor Aurangzeb also tried in vain to occupy the fort.

Dogra Fort 
Zorawar Singh had another fort built on level ground next to the Kharpocho hill. The fort remained till the First Kashmir War in 1947, when the Gilgit Scouts laid a siege to it fighting against the Jammu and Kashmir State Forces under the command of Lt. Col. Sher Jung Thapa. Thapa eventually surrendered after running out of rations.

See also

List of forts in Pakistan
List of museums in Pakistan

Gallery

References

External links
NorthernAreas.gov.pk Skardu page

Forts in Gilgit-Baltistan
History of Baltistan
Skardu District